St. Mary's Health Campus is a health facility located at Gurranabraher in Cork, Ireland.

History
The hospital was commissioned in response to concerns about a fever outbreak and opened in November 1955. The hospital developed a specialism in orthopedic surgery and, as St. Mary's Orthopaedic Hospital, it became the first hospital in Ireland to undertake hip replacement surgery in 1970. Construction on a new community nursing unit at the site started in August 2008. After orthopaedic services at St Mary's were transferred to the South Infirmary-Victoria University Hospital in 2011, an urgent care centre was established at St Mary's in 2012. Around the same time the facility became known as St. Mary's Health Campus.

See also
 Cork University Hospital
 Mallow General Hospital

References

Hospitals in County Cork
Buildings and structures in Cork (city)
Health Service Executive hospitals
Hospital buildings completed in 1955
1955 establishments in Ireland
Hospitals established in 1955
20th-century architecture in the Republic of Ireland